Tom Eaton is a Grammy-nominated American multi-instrumentalist, composer, producer, and mastering engineer. He is known as the composer of multiple albums, and as a producer and engineer who works with Grammy Award-winner William Ackerman. 

Since 1993, Allmusic credits Eaton 649 times on 147 albums for production roles, including being an engineer, a producer, mixing, mastering, and for performing piano, keyboards, electric bass, bass, guitar, percussion, accordion, and vocals. He was an engineer on Laura Sullivan's Grammy Award-winning album Love's River.

His influences include Tangerine Dream, Patrick O'Hearn, Vangelis, George Winston, and Tim Story.

Eaton currently resides in East Kingston, NH, where he composes and works in a converted barn.

Early life 
Eaton was born in 1971 in Newton Junction, NH, United States. He attended Phillips Andover co-educational university-preparatory school where he encountered their music laboratory in 1987 and started composing music.  A year later he started to play piano, influenced by George Winston.

Musical career 
In 1993, Eaton opened his first commercial studio, Thomas Eaton Recording in Newburyport, MA In 2009, he received a phone call from William Ackerman to join him as a co-producer at Imaginary Road Studio where they have since co-produced dozens of albums together. In 2014, Ackerman produced and Eaton engineered Laura Sullivan's Grammy Award-winning album Love's River.

In 2010, he co-released Winter Loves Company with cellist Kristen Miller.

In February 2016, Eaton released his first album, abendromen on riverwide records. abendromen garnered Eaton a Zone Music Reporter award as Best New Artist. He was credited on three of the 2016 Zone Music Reporter award-winning albums, not including his own. abendromen was followed up by indesterren, released in September 2016, also on riverwide records. He also released a download only album, Days of Green and Light.

At the 2017, Zone Music Reporter Awards, Abendromen was nominated as best ambient album and he won the award for best new artist.

In 2018, Eaton began performing with Jeff Oster and guitarist Vin Downes in a group they named Departure and appeared on an Echoes streaming "living room concert." One of the songs performed in the streaming concert appears on Echoes album, Victoria Place: Echoes Live 23. He also recorded SPICA/ACIPS on Important Records as part of their limited edition Cassauna cassette catalog.

In April 2019, Eaton released how it happened on Spotted Peccary Music. It was selected by Ambient Music Guide as one of the best of 2019. He also performed in the Zone Music Reporter's 15th Annual Music Concert in New Orleans on May 18, 2019.

In April 2020, Eaton and Ackerman received the Best Instrumental Music Producer Award at the 18th Independent Music Awards for their work on FLOW's first self-titled album.

In May 2020, Eaton released elements: audio environments on riverwide records. Textura selected it as one of their Top 10 Ambient / New Age albums.

Brothers 
In July 2021, Eaton, William Ackerman and Jeff Oster began to record the album Brothers.  Originally, Brothers was conceived by Oster as a collaboration with Ackerman, but based on Eaton's musical contributions (as well as his recording, arranging, mixing and mastering the album), Eaton was made a "brother" and given equal billing. Recording took place at Eaton's studio in Newburyport, MA and Ackerman's Imaginary Road Studios in Vermont. Eaton performed on piano, keyboard, bass, percussion, and electric guitar, Ackerman performed on acoustic guitar, and Oster performed on flugelhorn and trumpet.    The album was nominated for the Grammy Award's Best New Age Album.

Notable collaborations

Discography 

Winter Loves Company (2010)
abendromen (2016)
indesterren (2016)
Days of Green and Light (2016)
SPICA/ACIPS (2018)
how it happened (2019)
elements: audio environments (2020)
snapshots (2021)

 Brothers (2021)
 shades of fog (2022)
 verloren (2022)
 twenty-two: collected singles 2021-2022 (2022)

References

External links 

 Official website

Musicians from New Hampshire
1971 births
Living people